The Paravani is a river of southern Georgia. The Paravani is the outflow of Paravani Lake. It is a right tributary of the Kura (Mtkvari), which it joins in the village Khertvisi.

References

Rivers of Georgia (country)